Youngs Bay, or Youngs River Bay, is located in the northwestern corner of the U.S. state of Oregon. The Youngs River meets the Columbia River at this point, which is situated between Astoria and Warrenton.

The bay is named for the Youngs River, which was discovered in 1792 by William Robert Broughton of the Vancouver Expedition. The river was named for Admiral Sir George Young of the Royal Navy.

There is also the Old Youngs Bay Bridge about two miles to the east, completed in 1921. From 1895 to 1986, a  railroad trestle also crossed the bay. Built in 1896 for the Astoria and Columbia River Railway Company, it was later transferred to the Spokane, Portland and Seattle Railway, and finally to Burlington Northern Railroad. It included a swing-type draw span. The New Youngs Bay Bridge passed over the top of the SP&S bridge near the north river bank. The railroad bridge was used for the last time in 1982 and was dismantled in 1986.

The bay is fished extensively for sturgeon and salmon, when in season. Most of the gillnetting community moors and fishes in Youngs Bay.

References

Bays of Oregon
Bodies of water of Clatsop County, Oregon
River bays